The Chinese Benevolent Association of Vancouver is a Chinese Canadian organization headquartered in Vancouver. As of 2006 it has 2,000 members and serves as a federation of various Vancouver-based Chinese organizations. Douglas Aitken of The Georgia Straight stated that the CBA was the most important organization operating in the Vancouver Chinatown in the first half of the 20th century. The Vancouver Sun wrote "They were, for all intents and purposes, the government of Chinatown."

History
Wong Soon King, Lee Kee, Shum Moon, Yip Sang, Leong Suey, and Chow Tong founded the CBA in 1896. Ten years later the CBA received a designation as a nonprofit organization. Willmott wrote that the CBA's role as a federation of multiple locality associations in Vancouver did not correspond "to the reality of power groupings within the Chinese community in Vancouver" and that it was unlike other Canadian benevolent associations; Willmott concluded that the Vancouver CBA structure "probably" originated from the San Francisco CBA's structure. The Vancouver CBA operated the Chinese Benevolent Association Building in Chinatown; it was built in 1907. Additional association buildings opened in the 1910s and 1920s. As the British Columbia Chinese population shifted to Vancouver, the Chinese Consolidated Benevolent Association in Victoria moved to Vancouver in the 1930s.

In 1962 the association gave places in its ruling committee to representatives of every other Chinese association in the Vancouver Chinatown. This was done due to changing sociopolitical conditions; Chinese in that period were finding a greater acceptance in mainstream society and new immigrants were not oriented to the older Chinatown organizations. In 1964 Willmott wrote that "many Chinese", especially more assimilated Chinese, "do not recognize its right to speak for them". According to Aitken, the organization "lost most of its influence" in the 1970s, and the Chinese Benevolent Association of Canada split from it in 1979. Aitken stated that the CBA regained influence by 2014. In 1991 the president of the CBA estimated that the organization had 10,000 members; the per person membership fee was $1 and there were multiple paths to membership, so Hugh Xiaobin Tan, author of "Chinese-Canadian Associations in Vancouver," concluded that the exact membership was "difficult to determine".

Activities
As of 1964 it operated a Cantonese language school, provided legal counseling services, facilitated Chinese involvement in events for the public, established welfare programs, and issued public statements intended to represent the views of the Chinese community as a whole.

By 1964 Chinese Canadians were receiving proper services in the Canadian court system; in previous eras when Chinese were not well-served by the Canadian courts, the CBA served as a court of appeal for the Chinese.

In response to the 2014 Hong Kong protests and the 2019–20 Hong Kong protests, the CBA took out local newspaper ads that were sympathetic to the stance of the Chinese Communist Party and critical of the protesters. The nature and verbiage of the ads raised questions of involvement by the Chinese Communist Party's United Front Work Department and its affiliated groups. In September 2019, the CBA held a gala in celebration of the founding of the People's Republic of China. In July 2020, the CBA issued a statement in support of the widely criticized Hong Kong national security law.

During the 2021 Canadian federal election, the CBA hosted an event in support of Liberal Party candidate Josh Vander Vies.

In response to the 2022 visit by Nancy Pelosi to Taiwan, the group signed a letter, published in Ming Pao Daily News, denouncing the visit and expressing support for Chinese unification.

Representation
The organizations represented by the CBA include the Chinese Cultural Centre (CCC), the Chinese Freemasons, the Chinatown Merchants Association, and S.U.C.C.E.S.S. As of 1991 it represented 48 other groups.

See also
 Chinese Benevolent Association
 Chinatown, Vancouver
 Chinese Canadians in Greater Vancouver
 History of Chinese immigration to Canada
 Chinese head tax in Canada
 Royal Commission on Chinese Immigration (1885)
 Chinese Immigration Act of 1885
 Vancouver anti-Chinese riots, 1886
 Chinese Immigration Act, 1923
 Anti-Oriental riots (Vancouver)

References
 Tan, Hugh Xiaobing. "Chinese-Canadian Associations in Vancouver." Canada and Hong Kong Update (加港研究通訊 P: Jiā Gǎng Yánjiū Tōngxùn) 4 (Spring 1991). p. 11-12 (PDF document: p. 61-62/224). PDF version (Archive), txt file (Archive).

Reference notes

Notes
 Some content originates from Chinese Canadians in British Columbia

External links
 
 Chinese Benevolent Association of Vancouver (Archive) - "Origins of Historical Building in Vancouver" website, publ. Simon Fraser University

Chinese-Canadian culture in Vancouver
History of Chinese Canadians
History of Vancouver
Organizations based in Vancouver
Chinese Canadian organizations
Chinese propaganda organisations